Black River is a settlement in Newfoundland and Labrador.  It is periodically reported in the census - usually with a few dozen residents - though it is usually included in with a nearby settlement (Garden Cove).

Populated places in Newfoundland and Labrador